Digital fingerprint may refer to:

 Message digest, the output of a one-way function when applied to a stream of data
 Public key fingerprint, short sequence of bytes used to identify a longer public key
 Fingerprint (computing)
 Acoustic fingerprint, a condensed digital summary generated from an audio signal
 Device fingerprint, a compact summary of software and hardware settings collected from a remote device, for example a computer or a web browser
 Digital video fingerprinting, a technique to summarize characteristic components of a video recording
 TCP/IP stack fingerprinting, the remote detection of the characteristics of a TCP/IP stack
 Content ID (algorithm), a Google technology used on YouTube to identify content protected by copyright